Gallopamil (INN) is an L-type calcium channel blocker that is an analog of verapamil. It is used in the treatment of abnormal heart rhythms.

References 

Calcium channel blockers
Pyrogallol ethers
Nitriles
Phenethylamines
Isopropyl compounds